Pomegranate valley is a location 50 km east of Khorramabad, Lorestan province, Iran.

Language 
People living in the village speak dialects of the Papua branch of the Lori dialects.

Population 

The village had a population of about 50 families in 1988. The vast majority of them were Sadat Mousavi Bakhtiari.

A number of different tribes, who lived in the village Kornokar, and they insist on fighting. Unfortunately, Sadat Mousavi Bakhtiari were killed, villages were torn apart, and now of about 10 remaining families, most do not live in the village.

Geography of Lorestan Province